Amadeus Serafini (born July 7, 1990) is an American actor from California. He is known for his role as Kieran Wilcox in the first two seasons of MTV's slasher series Scream.

Career 
Serafini started his career with a role in the short film Smoke (2013), and a minor role in the short web series Oh La La, Hollywood Speaks French! (2014) In 2015, he starred as Kieran Wilcox in the MTV horror series Scream. In 2018, Serafini guest starred as Josh in the web television series Impulse, and starred as Terry in the independent comedy film Summer Days, Summer Nights. In 2019, he starred as Henry Van Horne in the independent action-thriller Project X-Traction alongside John Cena and Jackie Chan.

Filmography

Film

Television

Web

References

External links 

1990 births
Living people